F&TM may refer to:

 Faith and the Muse, a gothic rock band
 Florence and the Machine, featuring singer-songwriter Florence Welch